The University of California Marching Band, usually shortened to Cal Band, is the marching band for the University of California, Berkeley. While it is administered under the auspices of the university, the Cal Band is student-run and represents Cal at sporting events and social gatherings. The name of the band is "The University of California Band" by the constitution, but is typically called "The University of California Marching Band" or "The Cal Band". When the band marches out of Memorial Stadium's North Tunnel for football pre-games, it is referred to as "The Pacesetter of College Marching Bands, the Pride of California".

Student-run
Unlike most other collegiate marching bands, the Cal Band is not under the University's Department of Music but rather the Department of Student Musical Activities, with other student-led organizations such as the University of California Jazz Ensembles and University of California Choral Ensembles. The Band is entirely student-run, save for one University-paid employee, its Director. Five students, each heading a specific point of leadership within the band—the Drum Major, Student Director, Executive Secretary, Public Relations Director, and Senior Manager—are elected by their peers and serve for terms of one calendar year. The five student leaders and the Director form the Executive Committee. The Senior Manager, who is the band's formal liaison with the university, is elected by the previous Executive Committee. All the other student Executive Committee positions are elected by a majority vote of the Band membership.

Unlike other major collegiate bands, students run rehearsals, pick the songs, chart shows, arrange trips, and handle promotions through committee vote. This allows members to build their resumes and gain work experience.
As of the fall of 2022, the Band has 216
members (no color guard or auxiliary).

After Robert Calonico's retirement in June 2018, Dr. Matthew Sadowski was named the University's new director of bands.

History
The Cal Band has its roots in the University Cadet Band established in 1891. In 1923, the Band was sponsored by the Associated Students of the University of California (ASUC) and its student leadership structure was formalized two years later. In the early years (prior to 1971), various faculty from the Music department were appointed director of the band through an arrangement with the ASUC.

After the 1950 Rose Bowl against Ohio State University, the Cal Band decided to adopt its present chair step marching style after they discovered their performance looked lackluster in comparison to Ohio State's marching band. It is one of only three bands in the Pac-12 (the others being the Spirit of Troy and the University of Washington Husky Marching Band), and one of the few outside the Big Ten Conference, to use this physically demanding style. The Straw Hat Band, a voluntary subset of the Cal Band, was also established that same year.

After Professor Cushing (director from 1934 to 1950) resigned, the Music Department was asked to provide the ASUC with a new Director for the Band. Coincidentally, James Berdahl (Student Director in 1938) was returning to Berkeley to work on his doctoral studies in music. The Music Department Chairman, Albert Elkus, convinced Berdahl to serve as acting Director of the Cal Band until the department could find a permanent replacement for Professor Cushing. Berdahl became permanent Director of the Cal Band at the end of the 1951 season, and remained in that position until 1971.

In the fall of 1968, Dr. David W. Tucker (Ph.D, Cal, 1969) was hired as arranger and composer. He was appointed Associate Director in 1969. His responsibilities with the Cal Band included rehearsing, auditioning prospective new members, and directing on the football field opposite director James Berdahl. For the 1971 season, during Berdahl’s sabbatical year in Japan, Tucker was named Acting Director. At the end of the 1971 season, Tucker left the Cal Band to accept  the newly created position of Director of the University of California Jazz Ensembles, after having been the volunteer director since 1969.

During the 1971 season, substantial podium time was taken by Assistant Director Robert O. Briggs. He was appointed acting director in 1972, and was made director in 1973.

In the 1970s, the Band's leadership structure was reorganized, a new band constitution written, and sponsorship moved from ASUC to the University. In the Spring Quarter of 1973, the all-male band voted to admit women, in the face of Title IX sanctions against the University, which was now the Band's primary funding source. There were fewer than 10 dissenting votes, against more than 100 votes in favor of admitting women. In the Fall 1973 marching season, 23 women marched, together with 120 men. Although they rehearsed, marched and performed with the Band beginning in 1973, women were not entirely accepted by the Band's "inner fellowship" until through attrition the dissenting all-male band veterans had rotated out of the Band. More recently, the Band's membership has consisted of an even split of men and women, thus successfully broadening and improving the performance repertory possible for the Band's live performances.

In 1993, the Cal Band History Committee published a comprehensive history of the Cal Band. While this volume is now out of print, the text of the History Book can be found online at Cal Band History Book

Director Emeritus Robert O. Briggs died in 2008, leaving a legacy of musicianship spanning two generations of musicians.

Performances

The Cal Band has been seen and heard at a variety of performance venues. In the recent past, the Cal Band has appeared at the San Francisco Symphony's "Black and White Ball", performed for such names as George Shultz (former U.S. Secretary of State), Peter E. Haas and family (UC Berkeley benefactors and the owners of Levi Strauss & Co.), and George Lucas. In addition, the Cal Band has been seen on "The Ed Sullivan Show", the nationally syndicated game show "Wheel of Fortune", Santa Rosa TV 50's morning program, KTVU Channel 2's "Mornings on Two", KRON Channel 4's newscasts, "Bay Area Backroads", and sportscaster Vernon Glen's "Mr. Involvement".  The Cal Band sound has been heard on dozens of Bay Area radio stations, such as WiLD 94.9 and KMEL 106.1, Live 105, and K101, and rounds out its exposure on the pages of numerous Bay Area newspapers. In 2010, 2012, and 2014, the band also led the San Francisco Giants victory parade in downtown San Francisco.

In 2016, the band played alongside Coldplay, Beyoncé, and Bruno Mars in the Super Bowl 50 halftime show. On May 18, 2016, the Cal Band traveled to Beijing, China and performed at the Juyongguan Pass section of the Great Wall.

Wintertime activities include playing at various on campus sporting events and trips to play at various ski resorts in the Lake Tahoe region.

Before 2002, in the spring, the Band performed a traditional "Spring Show" in UC Berkeley's Zellerbach Auditorium, combining the marching and playing talents of the band with other, hidden talents usually reserved for off the football field. Spring Show was discontinued in 2002 after financial burdens to the band resulting from funding cuts to the University of California system. In 2009, the Spring Show was brought back, to be discontinued again after the spring of 2011.

In a different sort of performance, the Cal Band was asked to help with the Nobel Lecture by George Smoot in 2006 by recreating "The Big Bang".

Football Performances

During weeks of home football games the Cal Band gives several performances. On Fridays before a game, the Cal Band plays at the noon rallies on Sproul Plaza. On game days the Cal Band gives a concert on Sproul Plaza an hour and a half before kickoff. Following this performance, the Band marches in formation to California Memorial Stadium, leading a procession of Cal alumni and fans. During home football games the band gives a pre-game show, a half time show, and typically a musical performance after the game as the crowd leaves. During the game, the band is seated to the left of the primary student section, and plays stand songs, as well as fight songs throughout the game. A "break off" band performed in the front of each major section during the third quarter prior to the 2012 renovation of California Memorial Stadium. In 2017, the band played alongside University of Washington Husky Marching Band in their “Tribute to Horn Bands” show, featuring music from The Blues Brothers, Tower of Power, Earth, Wind & Fire, and Chicago.

In the Bleacher Report's power ranking of the top 25 college marching band pregames shows and traditions, the Cal Band was named 9th (of 25) as having a show that "beckons [the] former glory days, full of school songs and traditional formations" and is "a stand-alone classic".

Instrumentation
The Cal Band uses a fairly standard military band instrumentation with piccolos, clarinets, alto saxophones, tenor saxophones, trumpets, mellophones, trombones, baritones, sousaphones, glockenspiels, snare drums, tenor drums, bass drums, and cymbals.

California Alumni Band
The California Alumni Band, usually shorted to Cal Alumni Band, is a marching band consisting of former Cal Band members. The Cal Alumni Band is run by the non-profit Cal Band Alumni Association and is a subset of the Cal Alumni Association, an organization that handles alumni affairs of the University of California, Berkeley.

The Cal Alumni Band performs at various events such as: San Francisco AIDS Walk, Alumni Band Day, the Fourth of July Parade in Sausalito, California, Cal Basketball Games, and many other performances in the San Francisco Bay Area and across California.

References

External links

University of California Marching Band
Cal Band Alumni Association
Video clip of Pregame Show

California, University of
Pac-12 Conference marching bands
Marching Band
Musical groups established in 1891
1891 establishments in California